The Western Andes toad (Rhaebo atelopoides) is a species of toad in the family Bufonidae endemic to Colombia, where it is only known from the type locality in the Munchique National Natural Park, on the western slope of the Cordillera Occidental, Cauca. Its natural habitat is primary Andean forest.

References

atelopoides
Amphibians of the Andes
Amphibians of Colombia
Endemic fauna of Colombia
Taxonomy articles created by Polbot